Paniphon Kerdyam (Thai พนิพล เกิดแย้ม) is a Thai retired footballer and football coach. He is the current manager of Thai League 2 club Udon Thani.

Honours

Players
Sinthana
 Thai Premier League: 1998; runner-up: 1997
 Thai FA Cup: 1997
 Kor Royal Cup: 1997, 1998

TTM
 Thai Division 1 League: 2000–01
 Thai Premier League: 2004–05

Manager
Kasetsart University
 Regional League Bangkok Area Division: 2011

Army United
 Thai FA Cup runner-up: 2012

External links
 http://www.thai-fussball.com/en/News-Thai-FA-Cup-Army-United-through-to-the-final-item-379.html
 http://www.siamsport.co.th/Sport_Football/131109_191.html

1972 births
Living people
Paniphon Kerdyam
Paniphon Kerdyam
Paniphon Kerdyam
Association football forwards
Association football midfielders
Paniphon Kerdyam